Covarrubias may refer to:

Places
 Covarrubias, Province of Burgos, a village and municipality of the province of Burgos, Spain
 Chalco de Díaz Covarrubias, a municipality of the State of Mexico

People
 Miguel Covarrubias, a Mexican painter and artist
 Sebastián de Covarrubias, Spanish lexicographer and writer
 Urraca of Covarrubias of Castile, abbess of the village of Covarrubias, Spain
 Marita Covarrubias, a fictional character of the TV series The X-Files

Other
 Covarrubias (surname), a Spanish family name or last name